Ogmore Vale railway station served the village of Ogmore Vale, in the historical county of Glamorgan, Wales, from 1873 to 1958 on the Ogmore Valley Railway.

History 
The station was opened as Tynewydd on 12 May 1873 by the Llynvi and Ogmore Railway. Its name was changed to Tynewydd Ogmore Vale on 22 August 1884 and changed to Ogmore Vale on 1 January 1902. It closed on 5 May 1958. The site is now a public footpath and a cycle path, part of route 883 of the National Cycle Network.

References

External links 

Disused railway stations in Bridgend County Borough
Railway stations in Great Britain opened in 1873
Railway stations in Great Britain closed in 1958
1873 establishments in Wales
1958 disestablishments in Wales